The 1996 United States presidential election in Oklahoma took place on November 5, 1996. All fifty states and the District of Columbia, were part of the 1996 United States presidential election. Voters chose eight electors to the Electoral College, which selected the president and vice president. Oklahoma was won by Kansas Senator Bob Dole, who was running against incumbent United States President Bill Clinton of Arkansas. Clinton ran a second time with former Tennessee Senator Al Gore as Vice President, and Dole ran with former New York Congressman Jack Kemp.

This is the last time Sequoyah County, Nowata County, Caddo County, Craig County, Kiowa County, Mayes County, Osage County, Tillman County, Seminole County, Pontotoc County, Garvin County, Cotton County, Carter County, Greer County, Le Flore County, Murray County, Harmon County, Bryan County, McCurtain County, Coal County, Pittsburg County, Johnston County, Marshall County, Jefferson County, Love County, Atoka County, Okfuskee County, Pawnee County, and Pushmataha County voted for a Democratic presidential candidate. Oklahoma weighed in for this election as 4% more third-party than the national average. This remains the last presidential election in which Oklahoma has been decided by a single-digit margin, or that the Democratic Party has won more than 40% of the vote; due to its extremely conservative, Bible Belt reputation and dramatic demographic shift rightward, the state has not been competitive since. Clinton became the first Democrat since statehood to win reelection to the White House without carrying Oklahoma.

The presidential election of 1996 was a very multi-partisan election for Oklahoma, with more than eleven percent of the electorate voting for third-party candidates. This is one of the last presidential elections in Oklahoma in which the Southeastern portion of the state turned out in large numbers for the Democratic Party. This may be somewhat attributed to the influence of the bordering, and politically volatile, state of Texas, which can also be seen changing political orientation throughout the 1980s and 1990s from a Democratic area to a largely Republican one, and the bordering state of Arkansas, Clinton’s home state. In his second bid for the presidency, Ross Perot led the newly reformed Reform Party to gain over 10% of the votes in Oklahoma, and to pull in support nationally as the most popular third-party candidate to run for the U.S. presidency in recent times.

, this is the last time a Democratic presidential candidate carried any of Oklahoma’s congressional districts (in this case, the Second and Third Districts in the rural east), as well as the last election in which a Democratic presidential candidate carried the entirety of the Choctaw Nation, a majority of the Chickasaw, Cherokee and Creek Nations, and the counties which contained the Seminole, Pawnee and Osage Nations.

Results

Results by county

Electors
Reform: Dale Barlow, Grace Rayedelle Hill, Syvia Suggs, H. Kelly Haynes, Emmy Butler, Vivian Winterman, Jack Newkirk, Patt Cameron

Republican: J. Michael Brown, Steven F. Garrett, Skip Healey, Leo F. Herlacher, Dixie I. Galloway, Dale Switzer, Paul E. Thornbrugh, Gary W. Banz

Libertarian: Randy Ashbrook, Sharon Lynn Atherton, Roger Bloxham, Charles Burris, Steven B. Galpin, C. Michael Todd, Chad Vanis, Robert Waldrop

Democrat: Carl Albert, Julian J. Rothbaum, Thomas Dee Frasier, George Lee Stidham, Elizabeth Whetsel, Betty J. McElderry, Lorray Dyson, Marjean Mitchell

See also
 United States presidential elections in Oklahoma
 Presidency of Bill Clinton

References

Oklahoma
1996
1996 Oklahoma elections